Sylvia Rodríguez Aponte de Corujo is a Puerto Rican politician affiliated with the Popular Democratic Party (PPD). She was a member of the Puerto Rico House of Representatives from 2001 to 2013 representing District 31.

Early years and studies

Sylvia Rodríguez was born in Orocovis on January 8. She began her high school studies in her hometown. She then transferred to Puerto Rico High School of Commerce in Río Piedras during the day, and Central High School in Santurce during the night.

Rodríguez received an Associate degree in Secretarial Sciences from the University of Puerto Rico, and later completed a Bachelor's degree as Vocational Teacher.

Professional career

In 1985, Rodríguez founded the Liceo de Arte y Diseño in Caguas.

She also worked for several years in the Community Service Department of WKAQ-TV, and later in Telecine de la Tarde and the News Department.

Political career

Rodríguez began her political career in 2000, when she was elected to the House of Representatives of Puerto Rico at the general election. She became the first woman to represent District 31 as a Representative. During her first term, she presided the Commission of Tourism.

Rodríguez was reelected in 2004. Since her party lost the Majority in both the House and Senate, she couldn't continue to preside the Tourism Commission, but still served as her party speaker in it, which she maintained after being reelected a second time in 2008. During her third and last term, she was a member of the Commissions of Education, Family Affairs, among others. Sylvia Rodríguez Aponte did not a seek reelection in the 2012 elections.

Personal life

Rodríguez was married to former Representative and Superior Judge Juan Corujo Collazo. Corujo died on December 16, 2001.

References

External links
Sylvia Rodríguez Official biography

Living people
Popular Democratic Party members of the House of Representatives of Puerto Rico
People from Orocovis, Puerto Rico
University of Puerto Rico alumni
Year of birth missing (living people)